Julian Solís (born 7 January 1957) is a former boxer from Puerto Rico. He was born in the San Juan area of Río Piedras, but because of the closeness of his birthplace to Caguas, he often trained at the Bairoa Gym in Caguas. His training base, however, was the Caimito Gym.

A former Lineal and WBA Bantamweight champion, Solis is the only world champion in a family that produced two other world-class boxers: brother Enrique was outpointed by WBA Featherweight champion Eusebio Pedroza in 1978, and brother Rafael was knocked out in five rounds by WBC Super featherweight champion Héctor Camacho in 1983.

Professional boxing career
Solis began his professional boxing career in 1975, outpointing Ray Negron in four on 11 November. He won his first five fights in Puerto Rico, and then had his first international fight in December 1975, when he beat Juan Gómez in St. Maarten by a knockout in round two.  On 12 February 1978, he met fringe contender Nivio Nolasco, outpointing him over ten rounds, and travelled to the Dominican Republic, where on 15 March he outpointed Leopoldo Frias also in ten rounds. With a record of 12-0 and 5 knockouts, he returned to the Dominican Republic, where he challenged Julio Soto Solano on 16 October for the "Latin American Bantamweight title", winning the regional belt by outpointing Solano over 12 rounds.

World bantamweight championship
In 1979, he won four fights, including one over Julio C. Saba knocked out in eight rounds in Buenos Aires.  Solis continued on his travels in 1980.  He retained the Latin American title with a 12th-round knockout of future world title challenger Edgar Roman in Venezuela, won a fight in South Africa, and challenged the Lineal and WBA Bantamweight champion Jorge Lujan in Miami on 29 August, winning on points.

For his first defense, Solis returned to Miami, but he lost the belt and his undefeated record to Jeff Chandler on November 14 when he was knocked out in the fourteenth round.  After beginning 1981 with a win, he met Chandler again on 25 July, at Atlantic City, New Jersey. This time Chandler did the job in half the time, knocking out Solis in the seventh round. His next fight, with Kiko Bejines (later to die in a boxing related accident) in Los Angeles, also resulted in a seventh-round knockout defeat.

Solis started 1982 by winning two fights in San Juan and another one in Chile. By 1983, he was a popular performer in televised fights, often held in small Puerto Rican cities. He won four fights in Puerto Rico that year, and drew in Panama with the Number One ranked super bantamweight, Bernardo Checa. In 1984, he won three fights, including a ten-round decision over future world champion Kenny Mitchell on the 8 December undercard of the Azumah Nelson - Wilfredo Gómez WBC Featherweight championship bout in San Juan.  In 1985, Solis fought only once, outpointing David Campo.  He began 1986 by losing on points to Mike Ayala over ten rounds on 2 March in San Antonio. Solis and his handlers felt he had been robbed of a victory by the judges in this fight, feeling that Solis had done enough to win. They filed a complaint with the Texas state athletic commission, but in vain, as the officials reviewed a tape of the fight and decided the result should stand.

Solis fought on from this point, but he only won six of his last fifteen bouts before retiring in 1992. True to his globe-trotting style, only two of those bouts were in Puerto Rico, and he visited Italy, South Korea, South Africa once again, Miami and various American states. Among the boxers he faced during the last part of his career were future world Bantamweight champion Mauricio Stecca, former world Bantamweight champion Calvin Grove, Seung-Hoon Lee and Pedro Decima.

Solis retired with a record of 41 wins, 13 losses and 1 draw, with 22 knockouts. He remains active as a public figure in Puerto Rico, participating in charity exhibitions here and there.

See also

List of bantamweight boxing champions
List of WBA world champions
List of Puerto Ricans
List of Puerto Rican boxing world champions

References

External links
 
Julian Solís - CBZ Profile

1957 births
Living people
Bantamweight boxers
World boxing champions
World bantamweight boxing champions
World Boxing Association champions
People from Río Piedras, Puerto Rico
Puerto Rican male boxers